

Yacht support vessels are an increasingly popular way of extending the yachting experience. They can be used as a floating helipad, tender garage or accommodation for crew and specialist staff.

Table

Under construction

See also
 List of motor yachts by length
 List of yachts built by Amels BV
 Luxury yacht

References

Lists of ships
Support vessels